Sood Sangvichien (29 November 1907 – 8 June 1995) was a Thai medical doctor and anatomist. He taught anatomy at the Siriraj Hospital Faculty of Medicine, where he was a professor and served as head of the anatomy department and later dean of the faculty. He was particularly known for his work in archaeology and physical anthropology, which he pioneered in Thailand, making the first detailed studies of prehistoric skeletal remains in the 1960s.

References

Sood Sangvichien
Sood Sangvichien
Sood Sangvichien
Sood Sangvichien
1907 births
1995 deaths
20th-century archaeologists
Sood Sangvichien